The 2019 Kirklees Metropolitan Borough Council election took place on 2 May 2019 to elect members of Kirklees Metropolitan Borough Council in England. This was on the same day as other local elections.

Results summary

Ward results

Almondbury

Ashbrow

Batley East

Batley West

Birstall & Birkenshaw

Cleckheaton

Colne Valley

Crosland Moor & Netherton

Dalton

Denby Dale

Dewsbury East

Dewsbury South

Dewsbury West

Golcar

Greenhead

Heckmondwike

Holme Valley North

Holme Valley South

Kirkburton

Lindley

Liversedge & Gomersal

Mirfield

Newsome

References

2019 English local elections
Kirklees Council elections